Peace churches are Christian churches, groups or communities advocating Christian pacifism or Biblical nonresistance. The term historic peace churches refers specifically only to three church groups among pacifist churches:
 Church of the Brethren, including all daughter churches such as the Old German Baptist Brethren, Old Brethren and Dunkard Brethren; 
 Religious Society of Friends (Quakers); and 
 Mennonites, including the Amish, Beachy Amish, Old Order Mennonites, and Conservative Mennonites

In addition to the Schwarzenau Brethren and Mennonites, other Anabaptist Christian fellowships, such as the Hutterian Brethren, River Brethren, Apostolic Christian Church and Bruderhof teach pacifism as well.

This phrase has been used since the first conference of the peace churches in Kansas in 1935.

The definition of "peace churches" is sometimes expanded to include Christadelphians (from 1863) and others who did not participate in the conference of the "historic peace churches" in Kansas in 1935.

The peace churches agree that Jesus advocated nonviolence. In the Gospels Jesus explicitly taught his followers not to kill, but rather to love, bless, and pray for those who make themselves to be your enemy. He taught that if struck we should not physically strike back, but rather turn the other cheek. He told Peter to put away his sword. He explained that his Kingdom is spiritual, not earthly; therefore members of the Kingdom of God will live by spiritual principles, primarily Love. He told Pilate that his Kingdom is not earthly, therefore his followers do not use earthly weapons to fight. The weapons of our warfare are to be Love and Prayer. The Epistles and the Early Church continued this teaching, instructing that we should be willing to suffer as Jesus did rather than do evil to anyone. In the Plain Peace Churches today, no one in the military is accepted as a member, due to their divided loyalties. Stepping in between those who are being attacked and their attacker has been a long-practiced principle. Some believers have given themselves to serve a sentence of punishment, banishment, or death to deliver those who are weaker or younger. Jesus' suffering love and unwillingness to use force on others is their example in all things. 

Whether physical force can ever be justified in defending oneself is controversial. Most believers adhere strictly to a moral attitude of nonresistance in the face of violence. These churches generally concur that violence on behalf of nations and their governments is contrary to Christian morality, but agree that the teachings of Jesus were to explain the principles of the Kingdom of God rather than and contrasted with the ways of any earthly government.

History

Among all Christian denominations, there have always been groups of members who advocate nonviolence, but certain churches have consistently supported it since their foundation. Besides the three historic peace churches, they include the Amish, Old Order Mennonites, Conservative Mennonites,   Holdeman Mennonites, Hutterites, Old German Baptist Brethren, Old Order River Brethren, the Brethren in Christ, and others in the Anabaptist tradition; Doukhobors, Molokans, Dunkard Brethren, Dukh-i-zhizniki, Bruderhof Communities, Schwenkfelders, Moravians, the Shakers, and even some groups within the Pentecostal movement.  The largest Pentecostal church, the Assemblies of God, abandoned pacifism around the time of the Second World War. These groups have disagreed, both internally and with each other, about the propriety of non-combatant military roles, such as unarmed medical personnel, or performing non-battlefield services that assist nations in wartime, such as manufacturing munitions. One position might argue that Jesus would never object to helping people who are suffering, while another might object that doing so contributes indirectly to violence by freeing other people to engage in it. Most peace churches support alternative service options such as service to refugees or in hospitals, as long as they are not associated with the military.

In America the first conference of historic peace churches was held in 1935 in Kansas. Five years later in Canada, the Conference of Historic Peace Churches was formed in Ontario in 1940, headed by Harold Sherk to represent Mennonite, Brethren, and Quaker churches as they sought exemption from military service.

At one time, active membership in and acceptance of the beliefs of one of the peace churches was required for obtaining conscientious objector status in the United States, and hence exemption from military conscription, or for those already in the military, honorable discharge. But after a series of court rulings, this requirement was dropped. In the United States, one may now claim conscientious objector status based on a personal belief system that need not be Christian, nor even based on religion.

Peace churches, especially those with sufficient financial and organizational resources, have attempted to heal the ravages of war without favoritism. This has often aroused controversy, as when the Quakers sent large shipments of food and medicine to North Vietnam during the Vietnam War, and to U.S.-embargoed Cuba. The American Friends Service Committee and the Mennonite Central Committee are two charitable denominational agencies set up to provide such healing.

In the 1980s, the Quakers, Brethren, and Mennonites came together to create Christian Peacemaker Teams, an international organization that works to reduce violence and systematic injustice in regions of conflict. This was motivated by the desire for Christians to take peacemaking as seriously as soldiers and governments take war-making.

Other Christian pacifist groups

Christadelphians, 1863
The Christadelphians are one of only a small number of churches whose identity as a denomination is directly linked to the issue of Christian pacifism. Although the grouping which later took the name "Christadelphian" had largely separated from the Campbellite movement in Scotland and America after 1848, it was conscription in the American Civil War which caused their local church in Ogle County, Illinois, to register as conscientious objectors in 1863 under the name "Christadelphians." When the First World War was imminent Christadelphians in the British Empire took the same stance, though frequently faced military tribunals. During the Second World War Christadelphians were exempted and performed civil work – though some of the small number of Christadelphians in Germany were imprisoned and one executed. The position was maintained through the Korean War, Vietnam War and today.

Doukhobors
The Doukhobors are a Spiritual Christian denomination that advocate pacifism. On 29 June 1895, the Doukhobors, in what is known as the "Burning of the Arms", "piled up their swords, guns, and other weapons and burned them in large bonfires while they sang psalms".

Holiness Pacifists
The Emmanuel Association, Reformed Free Methodist Church, Immanuel Missionary Church, Church of God (Guthrie, Oklahoma), First Bible Holiness Church and Christ's Sanctified Holy Church are denominations in the holiness movement known for their opposition to war today; they are known as "Holiness Pacifists". The Emmanuel Association, for example, teaches:

Seventh-day Adventist Church, 1867
Adventists had sought and obtained exemption as conscientious objectors in 1864, and the Seventh-day Adventist Church from 1914 has a long history of noncombatancy service within and outside the military. In practice today, as a pastor from the Seventh-day Adventist church comments in an online magazine run by members of the Seventh-Day Adventist church: "Today in a volunteer army a lot of Adventist young men and women join the military in combat positions, and there are many Adventist pastors electing for military chaplaincy positions, supporting combatants and non-combatants alike. On Veteran’s Day, American churches across the country take time to give honor and respect to those who “served their country,” without any attempt to differentiate how they served, whether as bomber pilots, Navy Seals, or Operation Whitecoat guinea pigs. I have yet to see a service honoring those who ran away to Canada to avoid participation in the senseless carnage of Vietnam in their Biblical pacifism."

Churches of God (7th day)
The different groups evolving under the name Church of God (7th day) stand opposed to carnal warfare, based on Matthew 26:52; Revelation 13:10; Romans 12:19–21. They believe the weapons of their warfare to not be carnal but spiritual (II Corinthians 10:3–5; Ephesians 6:11–18).

Molokans
The Molokans are a Spiritual Christian denomination that advocate pacifism. They have historically been persecuted for failing to bear arms.

Partially pacifist groups

Community of Christ
Although non-credal and not explicitly pacifist, the Community of Christ (formerly known as the Reorganized Church of Jesus Christ of Latter Day Saints) is emerging as an international peace church through such ministries as the Community of Christ International Peace Award, the Daily Prayer for Peace, and resources to support conscientious objection to war. However, in the United States and worldwide, many church members are active in military service and the church provides active duty chaplaincy for outreach and ministry to military personnel.

Churches of Christ
Once containing a relatively large nonviolence faction, Churches of Christ are now more conflicted. Contemporary Churches of Christ, especially those that hold with the teachings of David Lipscomb, tend toward pacifist views. This means that they believe that the use of coercion and/or force may be acceptable for purposes of personal self-defense but that resorting to warfare is not an option open to Christians.

Fellowship of Reconciliation
As noted above, there are peace groups within most mainstream Christian denominations.  The Fellowship of Reconciliation was set up as an organization to bring together people in these groups and members of the historic peace churches.  In some countries, e.g. the United States, it has broadened its scope to include members of other religions or none, and people whose position is not strictly for nonviolence.  However, in other countries (e.g., the United Kingdom) it remains essentially an organization of Christian nonviolence.

See also

American Friends Service Committee
Anglican Pacifist Fellowship
Baptist Peace Fellowship of North America
Brethren Volunteer Service
Catholic Worker Movement
Center on Conscience & War
Christian pacifism
Christianity and violence
Civilian-based defense
Civilian Public Service
Conscription
Diane Drufenbrock
Doukhobors
Jewish Peace Fellowship
List of pacifist faiths
List of peace activists
Martin Luther King Jr.
Mennonite
Nonconformism
Nonresistance
Nonviolence
Pacifism
Pax Christi
Plain people
Religious Freedom Peace Tax Fund Act
Southern Christian Leadership Conference (SCLC)
Leo Tolstoy
John Howard Yoder
Seagoing cowboys
Churches of Peace, three buildings built by and for Lutherans in Silesia after granted permission from Austrian Habsburgs

References

Further reading
Driver, Juan (1970) How Christians Made Peace With War: Early Christian Understandings of War. Scottdale PA: Herald Press. 
(1999) Radical Faith. Scottdale PA: Herald Press. 
Friesen, Duane K. (1986) Christian Peacemaking and International Conflict: A Realist Pacifist Perspective. Scottdale: Herald Press.  
Lederach, John Paul (1999) The Journey Toward Reconciliation. Scottdale, PA: Herald Press.  
Ruth-Heffelbower, Duane (1991) The Anabaptists Are Back: Making Peace in a Dangerous World. Scottdale, PA: Herald Press. 
Sider, Ronald (1979) Christ and Violence. Scottdale PA: Herald Press. 
Sampson, Cynthia (1999) "Religion and Peacebuilding." In Peacemaking in International Conflict: Methods and Techniques; edited by I. William Zartman, and J. Lewis Rasmussen. Washington, D.C.: United States Institute of Peace Press.
 Stievermann, Jan. "A 'Plain, Rejected Little Flock': The Politics of Martyrological Self-Fashioning among Pennsylvania's German Peace Churches, 1739-65."  William and Mary Quarterly 66.2 (2009): 287-324. online

Trocmé, André (1961) Jesus and the Nonviolent Revolution; Maryknoll, NY: Orbis Books, 2003. 
Wink, Walter, ed. (2000) Peace is the Way: Writings on Nonviolence from the Fellowship of Reconciliation. Maryknoll, NY: Orbis Books. 
Van Dyck, Harry R. (1990) Exercise of Conscience: A World War II Objector Remembers.  Buffalo, NY:  Prometheus Books.  
McGrath, Willam (1980) Why We Are Conscientious Objectors to War.  Millersburg, OH:  Amish Mennonite Publications.
Horsch, Joh (1999) The Principle of Nonresistance as Held by the Mennonite Church.  Ephrata, PA:  Eastern Mennonite Publications.
Brown, Dale (1985) Biblical Pacifism:  A Peace Church Perspective.  Elgin, IL:  Brethren Press.

External links
 Historic Peace Churches in Global Anabaptist Mennonite Encyclopedia
 Who are the Historic Peace Churches (HPC)?
 Every Church a Peace Church – organization working to create more peace churches
 Writings on Christian Nonresistance and Pacifism from Anabaptist-Mennonite Sources
 Pacifism And Biblical Nonresistance
 NonResistance.Org
 Cascadia Publishing House – Anabaptist-related publisher of Historic Peace Church materials

 
Christian terminology